Bokoyo is a settlement in Dungu Territory, Haut-Uélé, Democratic Republic of the Congo.

Location

Bokoyo is in Dungu Territory, Haut-Uélé, Democratic Republic of the Congo.
It is about  NNE of Dungu and just west of the Réserve de chasse d'Azande.
The Köppen climate classification is Aw: Tropical savanna, wet.

History

On 14 August 1893 a Belgian expedition under Ernest Baert with 86 African soldiers reached Bokoyo from Dungu.
At Bokoyo they were joined by 350 Azande auxiliaries.
They continued on to Mundu en route to the Nile.

Notes

Sources

Populated places in Haut-Uélé